is the second mini-album of Japanese rock band 9mm Parabellum Bullet. The CD contains a DVD featuring music videos of "(Teenage) Disaster" and "Talking Machine". The songs "Sector" and "Mr. Suicide" were later re-recorded for The World e.p..

Track listing

PV
Mr. Suicide

Personnel
Takuro Sugawara – lead vocals, lyricist, rhythm guitar  
Yoshimitsu Taki – backing vocals, lead guitar
Kazuhiko Nakamura – bass guitar, screaming (tracks 2 and 5) 
Chihiro Kamijo – drums

References

2006 EPs
9mm Parabellum Bullet albums